Watan Ke Rakhwale  is a 1987 Indian Hindi-language action thriller film directed by T. Rama Rao. It features an ensemble cast of Sunil Dutt, Dharmendra, Mithun Chakraborty, Sridevi, Moushumi Chatterjee, Ashok Kumar, Puneet Issar, Prem Chopra, Shakti Kapoor and Kader Khan. The film revolves around how a spy (Chakraborty) fabricates a plot to bring a terrorist to justice, and how he is helped out by his lover (Sridevi), his elder brother and sister-in-law (Dutt and Chatterjee) and a jailed convict (Dharmendra).

Watan Ke Rakhwale released worldwide on 14th August 1987, one day before the Indian Independence Day. It received mainly positive reviews from critics and was a commercial success, becoming the 7th highest grossing film of 1987.

Plot
Radha Pratap (Sridevi) lives a wealthy lifestyle with her widowed businessman dad Raja Pratap (Sudhir Dalvi), her maternal grandmother (Lalita Pawar) and paternal uncle, Dr. Narendra (Prem Chopra), who runs a mental hospital. Shortly after her father dies in a car accident, her marriage is arranged with equally wealthy Naresh Puri (Dan Dhanoa), the only child of Raj Puri (Kader Khan). When the marriage is about to be finalized, a man named Arun (Mithun Chakraborty) interrupts the ceremony, informing them that Radha is already married to him, and produces proof and a witness, Professor Peter Fernandes (Ashok Kumar).

The wedding is cancelled amidst chaos as Radha claims that she had never seen Arun, leave alone married him. A few days later, Narendra and Raj ask Radha to sign a divorce petition, which will annul the marriage so that she will be free to marry Naresh, which she does sign. When the time comes for her to move out, she refuses and admits that she made a mistake and admits having been married to Arun, who lives with his brother, Suraj Prakash (Sunil Dutt), a Jailor and his wife Laxmi (Moushumi Chatterjee). A few days later, Naresh is arrested by the Police for smuggling, and lodged in a jail, where he is killed by a convict named Mahaveer (Dharmendra), who had seen Naresh sexually molest his sister, Vimla (Divya Rana). Enraged at the death of his son, Raj has his men molest and threaten Laxmi. Shortly thereafter Narendra's body is found, knifed to death.

Suraj confesses to this crime, is arrested, tried in court and sentenced to 6 years in the very jail where he used to be the Jailor. Raj arranges the abduction of Radha, Laxmi and Arun and has them confined on an island that is not within the jurisdiction of any country. The questions remain, why did Arun claim that Radha is married to him? why did Suraj confess to kill Narendra? and what is going to be the fate of Raj's victims?

Cast

 Mithun Chakraborty as Arun Prakash
 Dharmendra as Mahaveer
 Sridevi as Radha Pratap
 Sunil Dutt as Jailor Suraj Prakash
 Moushumi Chatterjee as Laxmi Prakash
 Ashok Kumar as Professor Peter Fernandes
 Puneet Issar as Akbar (Arun's Assistant)
 Prem Chopra as Dr. Narendra Pratap
 Shakti Kapoor as Koya Koya Attache
 Kader Khan as Raj Puri
 Parikshit Sahni as Assistant Jailor Madan
 Chandrashekhar as Police Commissioner 
 Lalita Pawar as Radha's Maternal Grandmother
 Ashalata Wabgaonkar as Mahaveer's Mother
 Divya Rana as Vimla "Vimli" (Mahaveer's Sister) 
 Birbal as Psychiatrist, Mental Hospital Doctor
 Sudhir Dalvi as Raja Pratap
 Dan Dhanoa as Naresh Puri
 Mac Mohan as Mac
 Jack Gaud as Raj Puri's Goon
 Baby Guddu as Young Vimla

Songs
All lyrics are written by Majrooh Sultanpuri.

Box office
The film was a super hit and seventh highest-grossing movie of 1987.

References

External links
 

1987 films
1980s Hindi-language films
Films directed by T. Rama Rao
Films scored by Laxmikant–Pyarelal
Indian action drama films
1980s action drama films